A Life Worth Living may refer to:

A Life Worth Living, autobiography of Michael Smurfit
A Life Worth Living, book by Nicky Gumbel
A Life Worth Living (anthology), a Bernice Summerfield anthology
A Life Worth Living, book by Mihaly and Isabella Selega Csikszentmihaly 
A Life Worth Living, 2014 album by Marc Broussard